Pahl George Davis (March 26, 1897 – April 13, 1946) was an American football player for the Green Bay Packers of the National Football League in 1922. Davis served as a guard, end, fullback. He played at the collegiate level at Marquette University and the University of Wisconsin–Oshkosh.

Biography
Davis was born on March 26, 1897 in Oconto, Wisconsin. He married Alice Belongia on March 1, 1924. He died on April 13, 1946.

See also
Green Bay Packers players

References

1897 births
1946 deaths
Green Bay Packers players
Marquette Golden Avalanche football players
Wisconsin–Oshkosh Titans football players
People from Oconto, Wisconsin
Players of American football from Wisconsin